Mohammed Kudus (born 2 August 2000) is a Ghanaian professional footballer who plays as an attacking midfielder for Eredivisie club Ajax and the Ghana national team.

Club career

Nordsjælland
Kudus arrived at Danish club Nordsjælland from the Ghanaian Right to Dream Academy, which he joined at the age of 10, in January 2018 together with two teammates, Ibrahim Sadiq and Gideon Mensah.

Kudus made his official debut for Nordsjælland only three days after his 18th birthday, in a 2–0 defeat against Brøndby IF. He played from the first minute as a striker, but was replaced in the half-time. With his debut, he became the ninth youngest to make his debut in the history of the club.

Ajax

2020–21 season 
On 16 July 2020, Kudus signed for Eredivisie club Ajax for €9 million, on a five-year contract. He made his official debut for the club on 20 September in a league match against RKC Waalwijk. Head coach Erik ten Hag subsequently called Kudus as a player with "incredible potential". He continued his strong performances, scoring one goal and providing three assists in his first three appearances. His debut in the UEFA Champions League for the home match against Liverpool on 21 October 2020, however, it was unfortunate. Kudus was subbed out after only six minutes, as he suffered a meniscus injury, keeping him out for several months. He returned back from injury in January 2021, coming on in the late minute to play 10 minutes in a 2–2 draw against PSV. He suffered a setback in his recovery and missed the rest of the matches in January before returning to action in February. On 21 February 2021, returned to Ajax’s starting eleven for the first time since October 2020, and scored a goal in the 50th minute of Ajax's 4–0 win over Sparta Rotterdam. 

After returning from injury, he played in 13 of Ajax's final 14 league games, as well as 31 minutes of their KNVB Cup semi-final match against Heerenveen as Ajax clinched the domestic double at the end of his first season. He won his first career trophy the 2020–21 KNVB Cup with Ajax on 18 April 2021 after a late 91st minute of additional time goal by David Neres. At the end of the season, Kudus made 22 appearances in all competitions for Ajax scored four goals and made three assists.

2021–22 season 
On 25 July 2021, Ajax announced during pre-season that Kudus had suffered an ankle injury and was training separately from the rest of the team ahead of the 2021–22 season. He made his return from injury on 21 September, coming on at half-time to score the fourth goal of Ajax's 5–0 triumph over Fortuna Sittard. Kudus suffered an injury while playing for Ghana in November 2021, sidelining him for three months. His first match back from injury was on 14 February 2022 against FC Twente, where he replaced Steven Berghuis for the final four minutes of their 5–0 victory. 

Whilst fully recovering from his injures and being restricted by playing time, Kudus played four matches and scored four goals for Jong Ajax in the Eerste Divisie, including scoring a hat-trick against ADO Den Haag.

On 17 April, he came on in the 86th minute for Davy Klaassen in the 2022 KNVB Cup final, which Ajax lost 2–1 to fierce rivals PSV. Subsequent to his return, he played in 11 out of 13 league matches, but only started in two of them as Ajax won the 2021–22 Eredivisie.

2022–23 season 
On 7 September 2022, he scored his first Champions League goal in a 4–0 win over Rangers.

On 19 February 2023, Kudus scored from a free-kick in the 84th minute of a league match against Sparta Rotterdam to earn Ajax a 4–0 victory. After scoring his goal, he paid tribute to fellow Ghanaian footballer, Christian Atsu, who died in the 2023 Turkey–Syria earthquake. He ran to the sideline and removed his Ajax shirt to display a white shirt underneath that read, "RIP Atsu."

International career 
Since 2019, he has been a part of the Ghana national team and scored several goals. On 14 November 2021, Kudus sustained a ruptured rip injury whilst playing for the Black Stars in their final 2022 FIFA World Cup qualifier Group match against South Africa. This injury kept him out for almost three months including missing the delayed 2021 African Cup of Nations despite being named in the final squad list for the competition. Kudus made a return into the squad to play for Ghana in their final 2022 FIFA World Cup qualification playoff against Nigeria. He played in both matches as Ghana qualified for their fourth world cup.

His biggest moment came in the 2022 FIFA World Cup match against South Korea, where he scored 2 goals, cementing a 3–2 win over the opposing team.

Personal life
Kudus is an ethnic Hausa and is a Muslim.

Career statistics

Club

International
Scores and results list Ghana's goal tally first, score column indicates score after each Kudus goal.

Honours
Ajax
 Eredivisie: 2020–21, 2021–22
 KNVB Cup: 2020–21

Individual
 Eredivisie Talent of the Month: May 2021
 SWAG Sports Personality of the Year: 2022
 SWAG Foreign Footballer of the Year: 2021, 2022
 IFFHS Men’s CAF Team of the Year: 2022
 IFFHS CAF Youth Team of the Year: 2020

References

External links
 Profile at the AFC Ajax website
 

2000 births
Living people
Footballers from Accra
Ghanaian footballers
Ghanaian Muslims
Hausa people
Ghanaian expatriate footballers
Ghana international footballers
Ghana youth international footballers
Ghana under-20 international footballers
Association football midfielders
Right to Dream Academy players
FC Nordsjælland players
AFC Ajax players
Jong Ajax players
Danish Superliga players
Eredivisie players
Eerste Divisie players
2021 Africa Cup of Nations players
2022 FIFA World Cup players
Expatriate men's footballers in Denmark
Expatriate footballers in the Netherlands
Ghanaian expatriate sportspeople in Denmark
Ghanaian expatriate sportspeople in the Netherlands
21st-century Ghanaian people